The first USS Sunnadin (AT-28), a tug, was laid down on 3 December 1918 at the Puget Sound Navy Yard as Katahdin; renamed Sunnadin on 24 February 1919; launched on 28 February 1919; and commissioned on 20 October 1919. It was named for an Anglicized spelling of the Huron Indian town, Sunyendeand.

Sunnadin was assigned to the 14th Naval District and spent almost a quarter of a century in the Hawaiian Islands operating from Pearl Harbor, towing Navy ships and other sea-going craft between ports in the 14th Naval District. During that time, she changed designations twice. On 17 July 1920 when the Navy first adopted alpha-numeric hull designations, she became AT-28.

She was in Pearl Harbor during the Japanese attack there on 7 December 1941. On 15 May 1944, she was redesignated ATO-28. In the fall of 1945, Sunnadin was ordered to report to the Commandant, 12th Naval District, for decommissioning and disposal. Sunnadin was decommissioned on 4 April 1946. Her name was struck from the Navy list on 8 May 1946. On 15 January 1947, she was delivered to the Maritime Commission at Mare Island, California, for disposal.

Honors
Sunnadin earned one battle star during World War II.

References

External links
 Photo gallery at navsource.org

Bagaduce-class fleet tugs
Ships built in Bremerton, Washington
World War II auxiliary ships of the United States
1919 ships
Ships present during the attack on Pearl Harbor